Taff Merthyr was a deep navigation colliery in South Wales.

References

Collieries in South Wales